Scenarios of Violence is a compilation album by German thrash metal band Kreator, released in 1996 through Noise Records. The collection features two previously unreleased songs. 

Tracks 2, 4, 6, 7, 9, 11, 13, 15 and 16 are remixed by Siggi Bemm & Mille Petrozza. Tracks 3, 8, 9, 10 and 12 are digitally remastered by Siggi Bemm. The live tracks were recorded at the Dynamo club, Eindhoven, Netherlands in 1988.

Track listing 
"Suicide in Swamps" (previously unreleased) – 5:09
"Renewal" (from Renewal) – 4:25
"Extreme Aggression" (from Extreme Aggression) – 4:41
"Brainseed" (from Renewal) – 3:07
"Terror Zone" (from Coma of Souls) – 5:52
"Ripping Corpse" (Live) – 4:19
"Tormentor" (Live) – 2:33
"Some Pain Will Last" (from Extreme Aggression) – 5:37
"Toxic Trace" (from Terrible Certainty) – 5:09
"People Of The Lie" (from Coma of Souls) – 3:12
"Depression Unrest" (from Renewal) – 3:57
"Coma of Souls" (from Coma of Souls) – 4:19
"Europe after the Rain" (from Renewal) – 3:13
"Limits of Liberty" (previously unreleased) – 1:39
"Terrible Certainty" (from Terrible Certainty) – 4:17
"Karmic Wheel" (from Renewal) – 6:07

The US version contains a slightly different track-listing. Track 5 is "Lost" from Cause for Conflict, track 10 is "Isolation" also from Cause for Conflict and track 12 is "Agents of Brutality" from Coma of Souls.

Personnel
Kreator
Mille Petrozza – vocals, rhythm guitar, remixing, cover art concept, cover design
Jörge Trzebiatowski – lead guitar
Frank Gosdzik – lead guitar
Rob Fioretti – bass
Christian Giesler – bass
Jürgen Reil – drums
Joe Cangelosi – drums

Production
Siggi Bemm – producer, engineer, sampling, remixing, digital remastering
Randy Burns – engineer, original engineering
Harris Johns – engineer, original engineering
Tom Morris – engineer, original engineering
Roy Rowland – engineer, original engineering
Peter Dell – cover art concept, illustrations, cover design, cover illustration
Stoney – photography

References

External links
 Kreator terrorzone: Scenarios of Violence

Kreator albums
1996 compilation albums
Noise Records compilation albums
Thrash metal compilation albums